The Jessie B. Smith House is a historic house located at 200 Charlotte Street in Fordyce, Arkansas.

Description and history 
This single-story wood-framed house was built in about 1890, and is an excellent early instance of a center-hall-plan house, a style which was brought about by growing urbanization. The house is three bays wide and one deep, with a brick chimney at the north end. The porch which extends across the front has jigsaw-cut brackets.

The house was listed in the National Register of Historic Places on October 28, 1983.

See also
National Register of Historic Places listings in Dallas County, Arkansas

References

Houses on the National Register of Historic Places in Arkansas
Houses in Dallas County, Arkansas
Buildings and structures in Fordyce, Arkansas
National Register of Historic Places in Dallas County, Arkansas
Houses completed in 1890